Syncoelicotyloides is a genus of monogenean. Species of Syncoelicotyloides are ectoparasites that affect their host by attaching themselves as larvae on the gills of the fish and grow into adult stage. This larval stage is called oncomiracidium, and is characterized as free swimming and ciliated.

Description
Members of Syncoelicotyloides are characterised by a broad leaf-shaped body, a muscular copulative organ armed with numerous hook-shaped spines and two dorsolateral vaginae with large slit-like openings.

Species
Currently two species are recognized: 

 Syncoelicotyloides macruri Mamaev & Brashovian, 1989 
 Syncoelicotyloides zaniophori Rubec, Blend & Dronen, 1995

References

Microcotylidae
Monogenea genera